= Ichiro Tsuda =

Japanese mathematical scientist, applied mathematician, physicist, and writer

Ichro Tsuda
- Born: Ichro Tsuda; June 4, 1953 (age 73); Okayama Prefecture, Japan
- Education: Osaka University; Ph.D., Kyoto University,

Ichiro Tsuda (June 4, 1953-) is a Japanese mathematical scientist, applied mathematician, physicist, and writer. His research carrier started at an early stage of chaos studies. His research interests cover chaotic dynamical systems, complex systems, brain dynamics and artificial intelligence.

He has contributed to the development and promotion of complex systems researches. He found several novel phenomena in chaotic dynamical systems such as Noise-Induced Order and Chaotic Itinerancy. He also proposed a chaotic theory for dynamic behaviors of brain (for example,) within a framework of cerebral hermeneutics.

He received academic awards such as 2010 HFSP Program Award for international collaborative research on the neural mechanisms of deliberative decision making in rats (Joint awardees were David Redish, Jan Lauwereyns, Emma Wood, and Paul Dudchenko). He was also awarded as a plenary lecturer in prestigious international conferences such as in the 6th ICIAM 2007, the international conference for industrial and applied mathematics.

He is also known as a translator and an editor for the Japanese translation of the highly rated textbook in the field of chaotic dynamical systems
